The 1901–02 Welsh Amateur Cup was the twelfth season of the Welsh Amateur Cup. The cup was won by Wrexham Victoria who defeated Machynlleth Town 1-0 in the final, at Oswestry.

First round

Second round

Third round

Fourth round

Semi-final

Final

References

1901-02
Welsh Cup
1901–02 domestic association football cups